Robin Allingham Aisher   (born 24 January 1934) is a British sailor. He won a bronze medal in the 5.5 Metre class at the 1968 Summer Olympics together with Adrian Jardine and Paul Anderson.  He was appointed OBE in the 1986 Birthday Honours.

References

External links
 
 
 
 

1934 births
Living people
Officers of the Order of the British Empire
Sportspeople from Maidstone
British male sailors (sport)
Olympic sailors of Great Britain
Sailors at the 1960 Summer Olympics – 5.5 Metre
Sailors at the 1964 Summer Olympics – 5.5 Metre
Sailors at the 1968 Summer Olympics – 5.5 Metre
Olympic bronze medallists for Great Britain
Olympic medalists in sailing
Medalists at the 1968 Summer Olympics
20th-century British people